Michael Anthony Harkey (born October 25, 1966) is an American former professional baseball player and current coach. He played in Major League Baseball as a right-handed pitcher from 1988 to 1997 for the Chicago Cubs, Colorado Rockies, Oakland Athletics, California Angels, and the Los Angeles Dodgers.

After his playing career, Harkey became a coach for the Florida Marlins in 2006 and the New York Yankees from 2008 through 2013, before joining the Arizona Diamondbacks, who he coached in 2014 and 2015. He returned to the Yankees in 2016 and is currently serving as their bullpen coach.

Playing career
Harkey was born in San Diego, California and attended California State University (CSU) Fullerton, where he played college baseball for the CSU Fullerton Titans. He was a first-round draft pick of the Chicago Cubs in the 1987 Major League Baseball Draft.

In 1990, Harkey finished the season with a record of 12–6 with a 3.26 earned run average. He played in the majors in 1988, 1990 through 1995, and then 1997 before retiring. He was plagued by shoulder and arm injuries throughout his early career with the Cubs. On September 6, 1992, during pregame warmups, he attempted a cartwheel in the Wrigley Field outfield, severely damaging his knee.

Coaching career
Harkey served as pitching coach in Minor League Baseball for the Rancho Cucamonga Quakes in 2000, the Fort Wayne Wizards in 2001 and 2003, the Lake Elsinore Storm in 2002 and 2004, the Mobile BayBears in 2005, and the Iowa Cubs in 2007. He served as the bullpen coach for the Florida Marlins in 2006.

Harkey joined the Yankees for the 2008 season. Under Harkey, the Yankees bullpen played a major role in their success during the 2009 season, culminating in a victory in the 2009 World Series. He served as the bullpen coach for six seasons.

After the 2013 season, he was hired as the Diamondbacks' pitching coach. The Diamondbacks fired Harkey after the 2015 season. He returned to the Yankees as their bullpen coach for the 2016 season.

Personal life
Harkey's son, Tony, is a former infielder for the Cal State-Fullerton Titans and Concordia University Irvine baseball team.  Tony won a NAIA World Series title in 2011 with the Concordia University Irvine Eagles.  His son Cory Harkey was a tight end for the Los Angeles Rams and is now serving as a Special Teams Assistant Coach for the Buffalo Bills.

Notes

External links

1966 births
Living people
African-American baseball coaches
African-American baseball players
Albuquerque Dukes players
Arizona Diamondbacks coaches
Baseball coaches from California
Baseball players from San Diego
California Angels players
Cal State Fullerton Titans baseball players
Charlotte Knights players
Chicago Cubs players
Colorado Rockies players
Colorado Springs Sky Sox players
Florida Marlins coaches
Iowa Cubs players
Los Angeles Dodgers players
Major League Baseball bullpen coaches
Major League Baseball pitchers
Major League Baseball pitching coaches
Minor league baseball coaches
New York Yankees coaches
Oakland Athletics players
Orlando Cubs players
Peoria Chiefs players
Pittsfield Cubs players
21st-century African-American people
20th-century African-American sportspeople
Alaska Goldpanners of Fairbanks players